Milarepa is a 2006 Tibetan-language film about the life of the most famous Tibetan tantric yogi, the eponymous Milarepa. The film was shot in the Spiti Valley, high in the Himalayas in the Zanskar region close to the border between India and Tibet due to the location's resemblance to the Tibetan landscape.

Directed by Neten Chokling, a Lama from Western Bhutan who has previously worked with Khyentse Norbu on the films such as The Cup and Travellers and Magicians, the film is about the adventurous formative years of the legendary Buddhist mystic, Milarepa (1052-1135) who is one of the most widely known Tibetan Saints.  The film combined myth, biography, adventure, history and docudrama.

The film featured Lhakpa Tsamchoe in her return to the silver screen in a supporting role as Aunt Peydon during young Milarepa's formative years.

The tale is a staple in Tibetan Traditions, Buddhism, and the legend of Milarepa elevates him to the status of national hero in Tibet and nearly so in Buddhist regions of India, China and Pakistan. He is one of the so-called Tibetan Saints or great yogis in Tibetan Buddhism.

A second part, of Milarepa's later life was planned but never released.

Cast

Listed alphabetically

 Jamyang Lodro as Thopaga
 Gimyan Lodro as Milarepa
 Jamyang Nyima (credited as Jamyang Nyima Tashi)
 Kelsang Chukie Tethong as Kargyen
 Orgyen Tobgyal as Yongten Trogyal
 Lhakpa Tsamchoe as Aunt Peydon

External links
 

Tibetan-language films
Films about Buddhism
2006 films
2000s adventure drama films
Bhutanese drama films
Films about Tibet
Films set in the 11th century
Films set in the 12th century
Films shot in Himachal Pradesh
2006 drama films